Chaudhry Faqir Hussain Dogar is a Pakistani politician who was a member of the Provincial Assembly of the Punjab, from May 2013 to May 2018 and from August 2018 till January 2023.

Early life and education
He was born on 1 March 1952 in Faisalabad.

He graduated in 1982 from Government Islamia College, Faisalabad and has a degree of Bachelor of Arts.

Political career

He was elected to the Provincial Assembly of the Punjab as a candidate of Pakistan Muslim League (Nawaz) (PML-N) from Constituency PP-67 (Faisalabad-XVII) in 2013 Pakistani general election.

He was re-elected to Provincial Assembly of the Punjab as a candidate of PML-N from Constituency PP-116 (Faisalabad-XX) in 2018 Pakistani general election.

References

Living people
Punjab MPAs 2013–2018
1959 births
Pakistan Muslim League (N) MPAs (Punjab)
Punjab MPAs 2018–2023